Marshall K. Harris is an artist and former professional American football player.

Early life and education
Harris grew up in Fort Worth, Texas, and graduated from Southwest High School in 1974.  After earning all-district honors as a football player at Southwest, he was offered athletic scholarships from several colleges but ultimately chose to stay in Fort Worth in order to study art at Texas Christian University. He would also follow in the footsteps of his father, who had helped lead TCU to Southwest Conference titles in 1958 and 1959, by playing football for the Horned Frogs.

During his time at TCU, Harris designed the "Flying T" logo that was featured the Frogs' helmets and would serve as the university's primary athletic logo until the early '90s.

Professional football
The New York Jets selected Harris in the 8th round of the 1979 NFL Draft, though he never appeared in a game for the team after walking out of training camp and finding a job in commercial art that fall.  He was traded the next year to Cleveland Browns, where he became a starter and helped the team reach the playoffs in both 1980 and 1982.  Harris joined the New England Patriots for the 1983 season before signing with the USFL's New Jersey Generals, who were owned by future U.S. president Donald Trump.

Art
Harris worked in various graphic design roles in the marketing and advertising industries after the conclusion of his football career.  His experience of being in New York City during the September 11 attacks in 2001 led to a decision to lend his skills to his own work rather than creating art for other people.  

After earning an MFA from the University of the Arts in Philadelphia, Harris moved back to his hometown of Fort Worth, where he experimented with morbid artwork that included photographs from obituaries as well as toe-tags.  Many of his works also evoke Western themes – in 2013, he was awarded the prestigious Hunting Art Prize for his life-size photorealist graphite drawing titled Round Up: B.F. Smith & Son Saddlery Circa 1940–1942.

References

External links
Marshall K. Harris website

1955 births
American football defensive linemen
Artists from Texas
Sportspeople from Fort Worth, Texas
Cleveland Browns players
New England Patriots players
New Jersey Generals players
TCU Horned Frogs football players
Living people